The 2021 Myanmar National League was supposed to be the 12th season of the Myanmar National League, the top Myanmar professional league for association football clubs, since its establishment in 2009.

Shan United are the defending champions. Magwe and Southern Myanmar are disbanded after 2020 Myanmar National League season. However, due to political crisis in Myanmar that occurred later, the league was cancelled.

2021 MNL Meeting
President of Myanmar Football Federation for this year's Myanmar National League football season. A video conferencing meeting of the Myanmar National League Committee consisting of the Chairman of the Myanmar National League Committee and the owners / chairmen of MNL Clubs was held this morning. 
According to the unanimous decision of the meeting, the 2021 MPT MNL-1 football tournament is scheduled to be held from April to September, depending on the outbreak of the COVID-19 virus in 2021. In the 2021 MNL season,  Shan United, Hantharwady United, Ayeyawady United, Yangon United, Yadanarbon, Rakhine United, Sagaing United, ISPE FC, including Chinland FC and Myawaddy FC, which were allowed to qualify under MNL Regulations, have decided to hold the tournament with a total of 10 teams. However, ongoing 2021 Myanmar protest had caused concern on the perpetration of the league, with several fans and players joining the movement, thus officially cancelling the league.

Changes from last season

Team changes

Promoted Clubs
Promoted from the 2020 MNL-2
 Chinland
 Myawady

Relegated Clubs

Relegated from the 2020 Myanmar National League
 Chin United F.C.
 Southern Myanmar F.C.
Magwe F.C.
 Zwekapin United F.C.

2021 Title Sponsor

Clubs

Foreign players

Stadiums and location (2021)

Stadium

(*) – not ready to play. MNL clubs that have not had their home stadia ready to host home matches currently use Aung San Stadium and Thuwunna Stadium in Yangon.

Personnel and sponsoring
Note: Flags indicate national team as has been defined under FIFA eligibility rules. Players may hold more than one non-FIFA nationality.

See also
2021 MNL-2

References

External links
 Myanmar National League Official Website
 Myanmar National League Facebook Official Page

Myanmar National League seasons
Myanmar
2021 in Burmese football